Smell the Disgusting Sweet Taste of Dried Blood is an EP recorded by the German electro-industrial act, Wumpscut.

Summary

Smell the Disgusting Sweet Taste of Dried Blood is a limited bonus vinyl that was released to accompany the CD Dried Blood.

Track listing
Side One

 "Dried Blood (Nystagma Cut)"  – 3:35

Side Two

 "Against Decay"  – 4:38
 "God"  – 3:22

See also

Wumpscut

External links
Official homepage
Fan page with detailed information

Wumpscut albums
1994 EPs